Our World, Our Way is the third and final studio album by Dem Franchize Boyz. It was their only album on Koch Records, and was released September 30, 2008.

The album's first single is "Talkin' Out da Side of Ya Neck!." Other tracks on the album "Mr. Feel Good" (featuring Mannie Fresh) and "Turn Heads" (featuring Lloyd). Bangladesh, the producer of "Bossy" by Kelis, produced "Talkin' Out da Side of Ya Neck," released as a single in January.

Others involved in the project include members of the group Pretty Ricky and producer Maestro.

Recently it was announced that the group has been released from capitol and has signed to Koch Records, where the album will have a new name and a new release date. The current single from the album is "Turn Heads", a collaboration with R&B singer Lloyd. The song premiered on August 12, 2008 and the video premiered on Yahoo! Music on August 28.

Track listing
 "Get Cha Hustle On"(produced by Nitti)
 "Put U On" (produced by Maestro)
 "Mr. Feel Good" (feat. Mannie Fresh)
 "Come Come" (feat. Blaze) (produced by Marvelous J)
 "Shawty Foreal" (feat. JR Get Money)
 "Talkin' Out da Side of Ya Neck!" (produced by Bangladesh)
 "Turn Heads" (feat. Lloyd) (produced By L.T. Moe)
 "Roll Ya Arms" (feat. Peanut & Joe Blow) (produced by TracKings LLC.)
 "#1 Girl" (feat. J Que) (produced by Maestro)
 "Make Ya Mad"  (produced by Trabeats)
 "The Life" (feat. City Black)
 "I'm Fresh"
 "The Killers, The Dealers"
 "It's a Go" (iTunes Bonus Track) (produced by Maestro)
 "Choosin'" (iTunes Bonus Track) (produced by Parlae & Maestro)

Chart positions

References

2008 albums
Dem Franchize Boyz albums
E1 Music albums
Albums produced by Bangladesh (record producer)
Albums produced by Jermaine Dupri
Albums produced by Mannie Fresh
Albums produced by T-Pain